Beautiful Future is the ninth studio album by Scottish rock band Primal Scream. It was released on 21 July 2008 by B-Unique Records. It peaked at number 9 on the UK Albums Chart. It was promoted with the single "Can't Go Back", and was produced by Björn Yttling and Paul Epworth.

According to the press release, "the album displays a heady mix of genre crunching taking in Philly soul, dark electro, accelerated rock'n'roll riffs and pure British pop, all given that particular Scream edge." The album features special guest appearances from Lovefoxxx (of Cansei de Ser Sexy), Josh Homme (of Queens of the Stone Age) and folk legend Linda Thompson. With the extended edition of Beautiful Future, as well as the album featuring two extra songs ("Urban Guerrilla", "Time of Assassins"), the album also includes the video for the single, "Can't Go Back".

It is the first album not to feature the guitarist Robert "Throb" Young, who left after the release of their previous album Riot City Blues in 2006 due to his retirement for personal reasons, and it is also the last studio album to feature the bassist Mani, who departed after Screamadelica Live in 2011, and then re-formed his past band The Stone Roses in the same year.

Critical reception

At Metacritic, which assigns a weighted average score out of 100 to reviews from mainstream critics, the album received an average score of 64, based on 13 reviews, indicating "generally favorable reviews".

Track listing

Personnel
Credits adapted from liner notes.

Primal Scream
 Bobby Gillespie – vocals
 Andrew Innes – guitar, synthesizer
 Gary Mounfield – bass guitar
 Martin Duffy – keyboards
 Darrin Mooney – drums, percussion

Additional musicians
 Victoria Bergsman – vocals
 Ellekari Larsson – vocals
 Lykke Li Zachrisson – vocals
 Maria Andersson – vocals
 Juliet Roberts – vocals
 Lovefoxxx – vocals
 Linda Thompson – vocals
 Erik Arvinder – violin
 Andreas Forsman – violin
 Christopher Öhman – viola
 Emma Lindhamre – cello
 Barrie Cadogan – guitar, slide guitar
 Bjorn Yttling – keyboards
 Josh Homme – guitar

Charts

References

External links
 

2008 albums
Primal Scream albums
B-Unique Records albums
Albums produced by Björn Yttling
Albums produced by Paul Epworth